Esperanza also known as Puerto Esperanza is a town in Peru, capital of Purús Province in Ucayali Region.

Esperanza is served by Puerto Esperanza Airport. According to the 2007 census, it had a population of 1,251 people.

References

Populated places in the Ucayali Region